Jacques Poulin (born 23 September 1937 in Saint-Gédéon, Quebec) is a Canadian novelist with a quiet and intimate style of writing. 
Poulin studied psychology and arts at the Université Laval in Quebec City; he started his career as commercial translator and later became a college guidance counselor. Only after the success of his second novel, Jimmy (1969), was he able to devote himself completely to his writing. Poulin has written fourteen novels, many of which have been translated into English by Sheila Fischman, and published by Cormorant Books.
 
Poulin lived in Paris for 15 years, but now lives in Quebec City.

Poulin's Volkswagen Blues was selected as a candidate in the CBC's 2005 edition of Canada Reads, where it was championed by Roch Carrier, author and former National Librarian of Canada.

Awards and recognition
Winner of the Governor General's Award in 1978 for Les grandes marées.
Nominated for the Governor General's Award in 1984 for Volkswagen Blues.
Nominated for the Governor General's Award in 1989, winner of the Prix Québec-Paris in 1989, the Prix Molson from the Académie des lettres du Québec in 1990 and the Prix France-Québec in 1991 for Le Vieux Chagrin.
Winner of the Quebec government's Prix Athanase-David in 1995
Winner of the Molson Prize from the Canada Council in 2000
Winner of the Gilles-Corbeil Prize (Le Nobel québécois) in 2008

Bibliography
The "Jimmy" Trilogy:
Mon cheval pour un royaume — 1967 (Translated as My Horse for a Kingdom) 
Jimmy — 1969 (Translated as Jimmy) 
Le cœur de la baleine bleue — 1970 (Translated as The Heart of the Blue Whale) 
Faites de beaux rêves — 1974 (Not yet translated) 
Les grandes marées — 1978 (Spring Tides, translated by Sheila Fischman, (Archipelago Books), 2007) 
Volkswagen Blues — 1984 (Translated as Volkswagen Blues) 
Le Vieux Chagrin — 1989 (Translated as Mr. Blue) 
La tournée d'automne — 1993 (Autumn Rounds by Sheila Fischman, (Archipelago Books), 2021)
Chat sauvage — 1998 (Translated as Wild Cat) 
Les yeux bleus de Mistassini — 2002 (Translated as My Sister's Blue Eyes)
La traduction est une histoire d'amour — 2006 (Translation is a Love Affair, translated by Sheila Fischman (Archipelago Books), 2009)
L'anglais n'est pas une langue magique — 2009 (Not yet translated)
L'homme de la Saskatchewan — 2011 (Not yet translated)
Un jukebox dans la tête — 2015 (Not yet translated)

See also
List of French-Canadian writers

External links
Prix Athanase-David 1995 announcement 
Author page on Canada Reads 2005
Critical bibliography (Auteurs.contemporain.info) 
Jacques Poulin entry in The Canadian Encyclopedia 
Archives of Jacques Poulin (Fonds Jacques Poulin, R11789) are held at Library and Archives Canada 

1937 births
Living people
Canadian male novelists
Writers from Quebec
Governor General's Award-winning fiction writers
Université Laval alumni
Prix Athanase-David winners
20th-century Canadian novelists
21st-century Canadian novelists
Canadian novelists in French
20th-century Canadian male writers
21st-century Canadian male writers